"Uh-Ohhh!!" is a song by American rapper Ja Rule, released as the first single from his first mixtape The Mirror (2009). It features a guest appearance from fellow rapper Lil Wayne.

Background
The song features a guest appearance from Lil Wayne and was officially released August 1, 2007. The song was released on iTunes August 7, 2007. An alternate version of the song featuring The Inc. Records artist Young Merc and a longer verse from Wayne leaked online. This version omits Ja Rule's second verse.

Track listing

Promo CD
"Uh-Ohhh!" (featuring Lil Wayne) (Radio Rip) - 3:49
"Uh-Ohhh!" (featuring Lil Wayne) (Album Version) - 3:47
"Uh-Ohhh!" (Instrumental)

Charts

References

2007 singles
Ja Rule songs
Lil Wayne songs
Songs written by Lil Wayne
Songs written by Ja Rule
Gangsta rap songs
Music videos directed by Dale Resteghini